Harry Stebbing Bush (7 October 1871 – 18 March 1942) was an English first-class cricketer active 1901–14 who played for Surrey. He was born in Dulwich; died in Farnborough.

References

1871 births
1942 deaths
English cricketers
Surrey cricketers
Non-international England cricketers
British Army cricketers
Military personnel from Surrey